Deion's Family Playbook is an American reality television series starring Deion Sanders. It premiered March 1, 2014, on the Oprah Winfrey Network. The first season premiere acquired 711,000 viewers with the finale achieving 946,000 viewers. In April 2014, Deion's Family Playbook was renewed for a second season.  Prime Prep Academy, where Sanders is a founder and a coach, features in the series. Season 2 of Deion's Family Playbook premiered on November 1, 2014. Season 3 of Deion's Family Playbook premiered on May 9, 2015. The series ended on June 27, 2015.

Episodes

Season 1 (2014)

Season 2 (2014)

Season 3 (2015)

References

2010s American reality television series
2014 American television series debuts
2015 American television series endings
English-language television shows
Television series by Lionsgate Television
Oprah Winfrey Network original programming